Al Sawdan is a sub-district located in Nati' District, Al Bayda Governorate, Yemen.  Al Sawdan had a population of 1166  according to the 2004 census.

References 

Sub-districts in Nati' District